George Ewan McCraney (July 23, 1868 – March 18, 1921) was a Canadian lawyer and politician.

Born in Bothwell, Ontario, his father was Daniel McCraney, a lawyer and political figure who represented Kent East in the Legislative Assembly of Ontario. McCraney was educated at the University of Toronto where he graduated a B.A. in 1892 and an LL.B. in 1895. He was first returned to the House of Commons of Canada at a by-election held in February 1906 for the riding of Saskatchewan, after the resignation of the sitting MP, John Henderson Lamont. A Liberal, he was re-elected in 1908 and 1911 for the riding of Saskatoon. He did not stand for re-election in 1917.

References
 
 The Canadian Parliament; biographical sketches and photo-engravures of the senators and members of the House of Commons of Canada. Being the tenth Parliament, elected November 3, 1904

1868 births
1921 deaths
Liberal Party of Canada MPs
Members of the House of Commons of Canada from Saskatchewan
University of Toronto alumni